The Abrostolini are a small tribe of moths in the Plusiinae subfamily, consisting of the genera Abrostola and Mouralia.

References

Plusiinae